The Life of Orgyan Chokyi is the namtar of Orgyan Chokyi, a Tibetan Buddhist nun who lived in Dolpo, a region in northwestern Nepal, from 1675 until 1729. It is the oldest of only three extant pre-modern autobiographies by a Tibetan woman.

References

Bibliography  

Autobiographies